Sociedade Esportiva Palmeirinha, commonly known as Palmeirinha, is a currently inactive Brazilian football club based in Porto Ferreira, São Paulo state. The club was formerly known as Juvenil Feitiço and as Feitiço Atlético Clube.

History
The club was founded on April 3, 1955, by supporters of Sociedade Esportiva Palmeiras, adopting similar name and colors. Palmeirnha means Little Palmeira. They professionalized its football department in 1967.

Stadium
Sociedade Esportiva Palmeirinha play their home games at Estádio Municipal de Porto Ferreira, nicknamed Estádio Vila Formosa. The stadium has a maximum capacity of 5,558 people.

References

Association football clubs established in 1955
Football clubs in São Paulo (state)
1955 establishments in Brazil